Euchrysops unigemmata is a butterfly in the family Lycaenidae. It is found in Malawi, Zambia and possibly the Democratic Republic of the Congo. The habitat consists of montane areas.

References

Butterflies described in 1895
Euchrysops
Butterflies of Africa